Tomáš Mikolov is a Czech computer scientist working in the field of machine learning. He is currently a Research Scientist at Czech Institute of Informatics, Robotics and Cybernetics.

Career
Mikolov obtained his PhD in Computer Science from Brno University of Technology for his work on recurrent neural network-based language models. He is the lead author of the 2013 paper that introduced the Word2vec technique in natural language processing and is an author on the FastText architecture.

Prior to joining Facebook in 2014, Mikolov worked as a visiting researcher at Johns Hopkins University, Université de Montréal, Microsoft and Google. He left Facebook at some time in 2019/2020 to join the Czech Institute of Informatics, Robotics and Cybernetics.

Mikolov has argued that humanity might be at a greater existential risk if an artificial general intelligence is not developed.

References

External links

Living people
Brno University of Technology alumni
Machine learning researchers
Facebook employees
Czech computer scientists
Artificial intelligence researchers
Czech expatriates in the United States
1982 births
Johns Hopkins University people
Academic staff of the Université de Montréal
Microsoft Research people
Google people
Natural language processing researchers